The grey-bellied shrike-tyrant (Agriornis micropterus) is a species of bird in the family Tyrannidae.
It is found in Argentina, Bolivia, Chile, Paraguay, Peru, and Uruguay.
It is a large flycatcher at 24–25.5 cm (9.5–10.1 in) long. Its natural habitats are subtropical or tropical dry shrubland, subtropical or tropical high-altitude shrubland, and subtropical or tropical high-altitude grassland.

References

grey-bellied shrike-tyrant
Birds of the Puna grassland
Birds of Patagonia
grey-bellied shrike-tyrant
Taxonomy articles created by Polbot